Audebert is a French surname. Notable people with the surname include:

Alexandre Audebert (born 1977), French rugby union player
Jean-Baptiste Audebert (1759–1800), French artist and naturalist

See also
Marguerite Deprez-Audebert (born 1952), French politician

French-language surnames